Quinn Martin (born Irwin Martin Cohn; May 22, 1922 – September 5, 1987) was an American television producer. He had at least one television series running in prime time every year for 21 straight years (from 1959 to 1980). Martin is a member of the Television Hall of Fame, having been inducted in 1997.

Early life
Born on May 22, 1922, in New York City, Martin was the second of two children. His father, Martin Goodman Cohn, was a film editor and producer at the studios of Metro Goldwyn Mayer; his mother was Anna Messing Cohn. He was of Jewish descent. From the age of 4, he was raised in Los Angeles, California. He graduated from Fairfax High School, then served five years in the United States Army during World War II, enlisting in the Signal Corps at Fort MacArthur in San Pedro, California on September 10, 1940, and achieving the rank of sergeant. He later changed his name to Quinn Martin.

While attending the University of California at Berkeley, Martin majored in English studies but did not graduate. Martin started his career in television as a film editor at MGM, joining his father and also worked as manager of post-production for various organizations, including Universal Studios (1950–1954). By the mid 1950s he had become an executive producer for Desilu Studios, founded by Lucille Ball (1911-1989) and Desi Arnaz (1917-1986). His first wife, Madelyn Pugh Davis, was one half of the writing team behind I Love Lucy. In 1959, he produced The Untouchables, a two-part special that appeared in season 1 of the Westinghouse Desilu Playhouse. The Untouchables later became a weekly television show on the ABC television network, which would two Emmy Awards in 1960.

Quinn Martin Productions
In 1960, Martin established his own production company, QM Productions. It produced a string of successful television series during the 1960s and 1970s.

Quinn Martin Television Series

Besides producing sixteen one-hour television network series, he also produced twenty "made-for-TV" movies, including House on Greenapple Road (1970), Incident in San Francisco (1971), Murder or Mercy (1974), The FBI Story: The FBI vs. Alvin Karpis, Public Enemy Number One (1974), Attack on Terror: The FBI vs. the Ku Klux Klan (1975), and Brink's: The Great Robbery (1976). Some TV movies, like Code Name: Diamond Head (1977), and The Hunted Lady (1977), were originally filmed as pilots for new television dramas which were never picked up by the networks. His only feature film was The Mephisto Waltz (1971), released by 20th Century Studios.

In 1978, a duo of investors purchased his wholly self-owned QM Productions; they subsequently sold it to Taft Broadcasting in 1979. Later in that year, the company was reincorporated into Taft Entertainment Television, though the QM name and logo continued to be used on-screen and for copyright purposes until the last official production was broadcast in 1983.

Typical format of a QM program
Shows produced by the company were usually introduced by announcer Dick Wesson or Hank Simms reading the title of the series and saying, "A Quinn Martin Production." Images of the stars of the show, followed by the guest stars for that week, were shown and their names announced, followed by "Tonight's episode", and the name of the episode, with various to-black effects.  In some series, such as The Fugitive and The Invaders, its backstory that led to the plot of the series, narrated by the announcer or the star, was told before the show's guest stars were announced. While episodes were structured into the usual four "acts" and an "epilogue," each was explicitly labelled at the start of each segment with the show title and the act number (or "epilog" near the end of the program).

Later life
Martin worked as an adjunct professor at the University of California at San Diego's Earl Warren College, where he also endowed a professorial chair in drama. He also established a scholarship for theater arts and communications students at Santa Clara University Martin moved to Rancho Santa Fe, California, near San Diego where he became president of the La Jolla Playhouse and the Del Mar Fair board of directors. He was involved with developing motion pictures for Warner Bros. with a new company named QM Communications.

Death
Martin died of a heart attack on September 5, 1987, in his home in Rancho Santa Fe, California.

References

1930 Federal Census 
Obituary: Quinn Martin. Atlanta Journal-Constitution. 8 September 1987.
Obituary: Quinn Martin. San Francisco Chronicle. 8 September 1987.
Obituary: Quinn Martin. South Florida Sun-Sentinel. 8 September 1987.
Obituary: Quinn Martin. Washington Post. 8 September 1987. 
Social Security Death Index
U.S. Army Enlistment Records (at enlistment)

Further reading
 Etter, Jonathan. (2003). Quinn Martin, Producer: A Behind-the-Scenes History of QM Productions and Its Founder. Jefferson, N.C.: McFarland & Company, Inc.

External links

1922 births
1987 deaths
Television producers from New York City
University of California, Berkeley alumni
United States Army personnel of World War II
American racehorse owners and breeders
20th-century American businesspeople
Burials at Westwood Village Memorial Park Cemetery
American people of Jewish descent
United States Army soldiers